Sindhura Lakshmana (1898–1922) was an Indian revolutionary fighter, who fought in the independence movement against British Colonial rule in India.

Biography
Lakshmana was born in Sindhur village, which is now in Jatha taluk of Sangli district in Indian state of Maharashtra.

During the time when Mahatma Gandhi's Non-cooperation movement was spreading across India, Lakshmana started his own struggle against the British by forming a band of men to loot the tax money collected by the government treasury and distribute it among the populace. In 1922, he was shot dead by the British in a sting operation, while dining at the home of a British informant, in a shot to the head by British snipers.

In popular culture
Sindhura Lakshmana is regarded as a hero and freedom fighter especially in the states of Karnataka and Maharashtra due to his redistribution of colonial taxes to the poor people of the region. Several films, plays and theatrical performances are based on his life.

A Kannada film Veera Sindhoora Lakshmana released in 1977 depicts his rebellion and struggle against the British Government.

See also
 Dr Arjun,Y.Pangannavar: Sindhur Lakshaman, Bhagat Singh of Mumbai-Karnataka, Valmiki Karnataka Kannada monthly 2015

References

External links

1898 births
1923 deaths
Indian independence activists from Maharashtra
People from Sangli district